Esad Karišik is a Serbian football manager and former player. As player he has played in FK Novi Pazar, in the Yugoslav Second League, between 1984 and 1986 (35 league presences, 1 goal) and 1988-89 (6 league presences).

Managerial career
He is currently the manager of Montenegrin Second League side FK Ibar. He has been the club manager since 5 November 2008 after the departure of previous coach, Gerd Haxhiu. He is of Bosniak ethnicity.

References

Living people
Bosniaks of Serbia
Association footballers not categorized by position
Serbian footballers
FK Novi Pazar players
Serbian football managers
KF Apolonia Fier managers
KF Elbasani managers
Kategoria Superiore managers
Serbian expatriate football managers
Expatriate football managers in Albania
Serbian expatriate sportspeople in Albania
Year of birth missing (living people)